Andrius Baltuška (born 26 November 1971 in Leningrad) is a  Lithuanian physicist.

Baltuška studied physics at the University of Vilnius later at the University of Amsterdam and received his PhD from the University of Groningen in 2000. After postdoctoral positions at the University of Tokyo, Technical University of Vienna and Max Planck Institute for Quantum Optics he became professor at the Technical University of Vienna in 2006.

Awards
 2004 European Young Investigator Award
 2006 Lieben Prize

References

1971 births
Living people
Lithuanian physicists
University of Groningen alumni
Vilnius University alumni
Academic staff of TU Wien